With Serpents Scourge is the second studio album by French death metal band Necrowretch. The album was released on February 16, 2015. On January 13, 2015 the album details were revealed. The album was released on CD, vinyl, and digital download. The track "Feast Off Their Doom" was also streamed on SoundCloud.

Track listing

Personnel
Necrowretch
 Vlad – Vocals, Guitar
 Amphycion – Bass
 Ilmar Marti Uibo – Drums

Miscellaneous staff
 Milan Novaković – artwork
 Patrick W. Engel – mastering
 Kaos – layout, additional lyrics
 Skull Crusher – additional lyrics

References

External links
 Amazon UK Order

2015 albums
Necrowretch albums
Century Media Records albums